Ann-Marie Norlin (born 7 September 1979) is a retired Swedish footballer. Norlin was part of the Djurgården Swedish champions' team of 2003 and 2004.

Honours

Club 
 Djurgården/Älvsjö 
 Damallsvenskan (2): 2003, 2004

References

Swedish women's footballers
Djurgårdens IF Fotboll (women) players
1979 births
Living people
Women's association footballers not categorized by position